Brainchild is the second studio album by the industrial metal band Circle of Dust, released in 1994 through R.E.X. Music and re-released as a remaster in 2016 through FiXT Music.

Overview
Brainchild was originally a side project between Klayton and Doug Mann. Their album, Mindwarp, was released on R.E.X. Music in 1992. R.E.X. wanted Klayton to make a second Circle of Dust album, but there wasn't enough money to make another album, so R.E.X. re-released the album as the second Circle of Dust album, Brainchild. The same cover artwork and layout was used for both albums, with only the Album Artist ("Brainchild" to "Circle of Dust") and Album Title (Mindwarp to Brainchild) changed.

Three of tracks are different from the original Mindwarp versions. The original recording of "Deviate" was replaced with the 'Sawed-Off Shotgun Edit' version from Metamorphosis. "Prayers of a Dead Man" is replaced with a newer recording. The only obvious difference between the versions of "Telltale Crime" is the removal of the sound clip of Geraldo Rivera from the beginning of the track.

The album contains sound bites from James Cameron's movie The Abyss, while the song "Deviate" contains samples from such sources as Ren & Stimpy, The Twilight Zone episode "The Mind and the Matter" and RoboCop.

A music video for "Telltale Crime" was released, and is the only video the band made at the time. It includes the band's live musicians, Daren "Klank" Diolosa (of Klank) and Klay's brother Dan Levler (of LVL).

In 2010, HM Magazine ranked Brainchild number 37 on the Top 100 Christian Metal Albums of All Time list with Doc stating that "without a doubt, this is one of the coolest techno/industrial hybrid metal releases ever. Paradoxically, it was the relative presence of a song structure and memorable groove that really distinguished this release from other 'noisier' entries within the genre."

Track listing

References

Circle of Dust albums
1994 albums
R.E.X. Records albums